Andriambavontsona (also Andribavontsona or Andrimbavontsona) is a town and commune in Analalava, Sofia.

Demographics 
The 2001 commune census estimated the population to be approximately 9,000. Of these, 76% are farmers, 17% are engaged in raising livestock, 3% are in the fishing industry, and 4% are employed in the service industry. Rice, maize, and cassava are important crops for agriculture in the town. The town has facilities for education at the primary level.

References and notes 

Populated places in Sofia Region